Hydrogenophaga caeni is a Gram-negative, anaerobic, catalase- and oxidase-positive, motile bacterium from the Comamonadaceae family, with a single polar flagellum, which was isolated from an activated sludge. Colonies of H. caeni are white colored.

References

External links
Type strain of Hydrogenophaga caeni at BacDive -  the Bacterial Diversity Metadatabase

Comamonadaceae
Bacteria described in 2007